Jeff Bernat (born December 11, 1989) is a Filipino-American singer, songwriter and record producer. He debuted in 2012 with the album, The Gentleman Approach, and developed a significant fan base in South Korea after the album track, "Call You Mine," was featured on the 2014 Korean drama, You Are My Destiny.

Early life
Bernat was born in Subic, Philippines, but grew up in Reno, Nevada.

Discography

Studio albums

Extended plays

Singles

Soundtrack appearances

References

External links
 Official website
 Jeff Bernat at Coridel Entertainment
 Jeff Bernat at P-Vine Records

1989 births
Living people
American soul singers
American contemporary R&B singers
American musicians of Filipino descent
Record producers from Nevada
Musicians from Reno, Nevada
21st-century American male singers
21st-century American singers